Devil and Angel is a 2015 Chinese comedy film directed by Yu Baimei and Deng Chao and starring Deng Chao and Sun Li. It was released in China on December 24, 2015.

Plot

Two exact opposite personalities (Mo Feili, a hooligan debt collector, and Zha Xiaodao, a neurotic rule-obsessed accountant/PhD) are teamed up by a scheming guru, who has been cheating the collector. When they collect 3.2 million yuan they find themselves in trouble and have to deal with the differences between them to work together and find a place for themselves in the world.

Cast
Deng Chao as  Mo Feili 
Sun Li as Zha Xiaodao 
Dai Lele
Liang Chao as Zhe Ergen
Yang Xinming
Wang Yanhui

Reception
The film grossed  on its opening weekend in China.

Maggie Lee of Variety described the film: "Husband-and-wife leads Deng Chao and Betty Sun Li star as debt collectors in this hyper but effective Chinese comedy"

References

External links

Chinese comedy films
2015 comedy films
Beijing Enlight Pictures films
Films directed by Chao Deng
Films directed by Baimei Yu